7p22.1 microduplication syndrome (also called Trisomy 7p22.1) is a newly discovered genetic disorder which is characterized by cranial and facial dysmorphisms, intellectual disability, and motor-speech delays. It is caused by a duplication of the p22.1 region of chromosome 7.

Signs and symptoms 

The symptoms of this syndrome are (but are not limited to) cranio-facial dysmorphisms such as macrocephaly, frontal bossing, low-set ears, hypertelorism, etc., intellectual disabilities, speech and motor delays, and heart, ocular, renal and skeletal defects (such as patent foramen ovale {heart} or brachydactyly type D {skeletal} ).

Causes 

This condition (as the name implies) is caused by a 430 kB duplication of the p22.1 region of chromosome 7. This mutation is autosomal recessive, meaning that a baby would need 1 copy of a mutated gene from both parents in order to show symptoms of the disorder.

Epidemiology 

Only 60 cases of 7q22.1 microduplication syndrome have been recorded in medical literature.

References 

Genetic diseases and disorders